Ashani may refer to:

People 

 Ashani Fairclough, Jamaican footballer 
Ashani Weeraratna, American-South African cancer researcher

Other uses 

Ashani Sanket (Distant Thunder)
Ashani pistol